Ramsdenia is a genus of land snails with an operculum, terrestrial gastropod mollusks in the family Pomatiidae.

Species 
Species within the genus Ramsdenia include:
 Ramsdenia bufo (Pfeiffer, 1864)
 Ramsdenia natensoni (Torre & Bartsch, 1941)
 Ramsdenia nobilitata (Gundlach in Poey, 1858)
 Ramsdenia perspectiva (Gundlach in Pfeiffer, 1859)

References 

Pomatiidae